Inside of Me is a 2009 short film directed by filmmaker Robert X. Golphin, about a woman who is told that she can't have children. She becomes convinced there's something growing within her. It's the psychological and physical exploration of how devastating news and mysterious happenings threaten to destroy the relationship and lives of a loving couple.

Cast 
Lauren Jane Krystofolski as Sharon
Tony Kates as Todd
Lori M. Childress as Doctor

Awards

Exhibition
The film has screened at: Queens Int'l Film Fest, Reelblack Short Film Showcase, Los Angeles Reel Film Fest, Trail Dance Film Fest, New York Short Film Fest, New Filmmakers New York, Worldfest Houston Int'l Film Fest, Philadelphia Int'l Film Festival, Indie Short Film Competition And Atlantic City Cinefest.

It was announced that Inside of Me was selected to screen at a New York event called "Art in Motion" on Friday, June 15, 2012.

References

External links
 Blue Angelent, LLC, the production company
 
  Trail Dance Film Festival "Inside of Me" Profile Page
  Short Film Central "Inside of Me" Profile Page
  Reelblack Article About "Inside of Me"
  Los Angeles Reel Film Festival Awards List
  Accolade Competition Awards List

2009 films
2009 short films
2000s English-language films
American short films

es:Inside of Me